Dave O'Callaghan (born 12 January 1990) is an Irish rugby union player for French Rugby Pro D2 side Biarritz. He plays as a flanker, usually blindside, but can also play as a lock. O'Callaghan has a Commerce degree from University College Cork.

Professional career

Munster
O'Callaghan moved up through the Munster Academy after joining in November 2009. As a member of the academy, he frequently appeared for Munster A in friendlies and in the British and Irish Cup. He was a member of the Munster A team that finished runners-up in the 2009–10 British and Irish Cup.

On 8 October 2011, O'Callaghan made his full Munster debut against Ospreys in a Pro12 match. O'Callaghan was named in Munster's squad for the 2011–12 Heineken Cup in October 2011. He made his Heineken Cup debut against Northampton Saints on 21 January 2012, in Round 6 of the pool stage.

O'Callaghan signed a Development contract with Munster in March 2012. On 27 April 2012, O'Callaghan started for the Munster A team that beat Cross Keys 31–12 to win the final of the 2011–12 British and Irish Cup. He won the John McCarthy Award for Munster Academy Player of the Year for the 2011–12 season.

In January 2013, O'Callaghan agreed a two-year contract extension with Munster. In January 2015, O'Callaghan signed a one-year contract to remain with Munster until at least June 2016. O'Callaghan started in Munster's opening game of the 2015–16 European Rugby Champions Cup on 14 November 2015. In December 2015, O'Callaghan signed a two-year contract extension with Munster. On 24 September 2016, O'Callaghan scored the bonus-point try in Munster's 28–14 win against Edinburgh. He made his return from a knee injury on 19 January 2018, coming off the bench for Munster A in their 27–0 British and Irish Cup win against Ospreys Premiership Select. O'Callaghan signed a one-year contract extension with Munster in March 2018.

Biarritz
O'Callaghan left Munster to join French Rugby Pro D2 side Biarritz ahead of the 2019–20 season.

Ireland
O'Callaghan joined the Emerging Ireland squad for the 2013 IRB Tbilisi Cup in June 2013. He came off the bench in the sides 19–8 defeat at the hands of South Africa President's XV on 11 June 2013. O'Callaghan started against Uruguay in Emerging Ireland's final game 42–33 win.

References

External links
Munster Profile

Pro14 Profile
U20 Six Nations Profile

Living people
1990 births
People from Youghal
People educated at Midleton College
Rugby union players from County Cork
Irish rugby union players
Dolphin RFC players
Munster Rugby players
Biarritz Olympique players
Irish expatriate rugby union players
Expatriate rugby union players in France
Irish expatriate sportspeople in France
Rugby union locks
Rugby union flankers